The following is a list of FCC-licensed radio stations in the U.S. state of Idaho, which can be sorted by their call signs, frequencies, cities of license, licensees, and programming formats.

List of radio stations

Defunct
 KID
 KLCW-LP
 KMCL
 KRSI
 KSKI
 KTSJ
 KWAL

References

External links
World Radio Map – List of radio stations in Idaho

 
Idaho
Radio